The 2022 PDC Asian Championship was a tournament organized by the Professional Darts Corporation for Asian players. The tournament featured 48 players from all around Asia, with the four semi-finalists earning a place in the 2023 PDC World Darts Championship and the winner also earning a place in the 2022 Grand Slam of Darts.

 won the tournament, defeating  7–5 in the final. Perez, Nebrida, plus semi-finalists  and  all qualified for the World Championship as a result of this tournament, with Perez also qualifying for the Grand Slam, becoming only the second Asian player after  to do so.

This was the first edition of the tournament, which was created following the inability to revive the successful PDC Asian Tour, which hadn't been able to be run since 2019, owing to the COVID-19 pandemic.

Format
The 48-player main event on 24–25 September was preceded by two days of Asian Series qualifiers in Fukuoka, with four qualifying events being split across 22–23 September.

The 48 player main event began with a round-robin stage on 24 September, with the players split into 16 groups of three. 

Each group winner progressed to compete in the last 16 later on 24 September, with 25 September featuring the quarter-finals, semi-finals and final.

Match Format

In the Asian Series Qualifiers, players will receive one point per victory from the first full round drawn without byes to form the Order of Merit.

Prize money
The total prize fund will be US$100,000. The four semi-finalists of the tournament will earn a place in the 2023 PDC World Darts Championship and the winner will earn a place in the 2022 Grand Slam of Darts as well.

Qualifiers
The 48-player main event was preceded by two days of Asian Series qualifiers in Fukuoka, with four qualifying events, two being held on 22 September, two being held on 23 September.

The last four players from each qualifier secured a place in the main event, alongside a further 10 players from an Asian Series Order of Merit.

The main event also featured the eight players who competed in the 2022 PDC World Cup of Darts for Hong Kong, Japan, Philippines and Singapore, plus one additional qualifier per country.

A further ten regional qualifiers - held in Bahrain, mainland China, India, Macau, Malaysia, Mongolia, South Korea, Taiwan, Thailand and the United Arab Emirates - each produced one qualifier.

The qualifiers were:

Asian Series Qualifiers
Event 1
  Raymond Copano
  Jun Matsuda
  Seigo Asada
  Takayuki Masatsu

Event 2
  Keita Ono
  Edward Foulkes
  Yutaka Sunakawa
  Yuichiro Ogawa

Event 3
  Alain Abiabi
  Ryuki Morikubo
  Yuki Yamada
  Teppei Nishi

Event 4
  Sho Katsumi
  Kota Suzuki
  Gan-Erdene Sharavsambuu
  Royden Lam

Asian Series Order of Merit Qualifiers
  Tomoya Tsumura
  Shingo Enomata
  Mikuru Suzuki
  Teng Lieh Pupo
  Yoshihisa Baba
  Paolo Nebrida
  Ryusei Azemoto
  Enkhbold Surenjav
  Ao Ishihara 
  Akito Yamagata

Regional Qualifiers
  Basem Mohamed
  Zhiwei Lin
  Mohd Adbul Mannan Syed
  Kam Weng Cheng
  Jenn Ming Tan
  Purevloov Tungalag 
  Yong-Seok Kim
  Yan-Bin Chen
  Chaiyan Paiaree
  Hussain Nadir Ali

2022 PDC World Cup of Darts Participants
  Lok Yin Lee
  Ho Tung Ching
  Toru Suzuki
  Tomoya Goto
  Lourence Ilagan
  RJ Escaros
  Paul Lim
  Harith Lim

Qualifiers From World Cup of Darts Nations
  Man Lok Leung
  Mitsuhiko Tatsunami
  Christian Perez
  Zhao Chen Tay

Draw

Group stage
All group matches are best of nine legs  Only winners in each group qualify for the knock-out stage

NB: P = Played; W = Won; L = Lost; LF = Legs for; LA = Legs against;  = Plus/minus record, in relation to legs; AVG = mean average; Pts = Points; Status = Qualified to knockout stage

Group A

24 September

Group B

24 September

Group C

24 September

Group D

24 September

Group E

24 September

Group F

24 September

Group G

24 September

Group H

24 September

Group I

24 September

Group J

24 September

Group K

24 September

Group L

24 September

Group M

24 September

Group N

24 September

Group O

24 September

Group P

24 September

Knockout stage

Statistics

Top averages
This table shows the highest averages achieved by players throughout the tournament.

References

Asian Championship
Asian Championship
PDC Asian Championship